Major-General Frederick Elliot Hotblack  (12 March 18879 January 1979) was a senior British Army officer who fought in the First World War as an early member of the Tank Corps (later the Royal Tank Regiment) and commanded the 2nd Armoured Division in the early part of the Second World War.

Military career

Hotblack was commissioned into the Norfolk Regiment in 1915 and served in the First World War as an intelligence officer in France before transferring to the then "Heavy Branch" of the Machine Gun Corps (later the Royal Tank Corps) in 1916. In November, while a temporary Captain he guided a tank to its objective by walking ahead of it despite enemy fire. For this action he was awarded the DSO. On the 23rd, he took control of infantry who had lost their officers and with tanks organised an attack - earning a bar to his DSO.

He took staff officer positions for the remainder of the War. He was awarded the Military Cross for "conspicuous gallantry, initiative and devotion to duty" in September 1918. While assessing the front, he found a German position blocking the advance and organised two tanks into action against it, riding in one of them himself. Despite being injured during the attack, after the tanks were knocked out he got the wounded to safety and arranged infantry for a defence against a counterattack.

After the War he attended the Staff College, Camberley from 1920 to 1921, and served in the War Office before becoming brigade major of 1st Rhine Brigade in 1921. He was appointed an instructor at the Staff College in 1932, military attaché at the British Embassy in Berlin in 1935 and Deputy Director of Staff Duties at the War Office in 1937. He served in Second World War on the General Staff of the British Expeditionary Force (BEF) before becoming General Officer Commanding (GOC) 2nd Armoured Division in 1939 and then, following an accident in April 1940, being invalided out of the army in 1941.

References

Bibliography

Bibliography
Biography Tank Museum, Bovington
Generals of World War II

1887 births
1979 deaths
Machine Gun Corps officers
British Army generals of World War II
Royal Norfolk Regiment officers
People from Norfolk
Royal Tank Regiment officers
Companions of the Distinguished Service Order
Recipients of the Military Cross
Graduates of the Staff College, Camberley
British Army personnel of World War I
British Army major generals
British military attachés
Academics of the Staff College, Camberley
Military personnel from Norwich